In Greek mythology, Ianthe (Ancient Greek: Ἰάνθη Ianthê) or Janthe was one of the 3,000 Oceanids, water-nymph daughters of the Titans Oceanus and his sister-spouse Tethys. Her name means ‘she who delights’, or probably from ianthên 'heat' or ianthos 'violet'.

Mythology 
Along with her sisters, Ianthe was one of the companions of Persephone when the daughter of Demeter was abducted by Hades.

Notes

References 

 Gaius Julius Hyginus, Fabulae from The Myths of Hyginus translated and edited by Mary Grant. University of Kansas Publications in Humanistic Studies. Online version at the Topos Text Project.
 Hesiod, Theogony from The Homeric Hymns and Homerica with an English Translation by Hugh G. Evelyn-White, Cambridge, MA.,Harvard University Press; London, William Heinemann Ltd. 1914. Online version at the Perseus Digital Library. Greek text available from the same website.
 The Homeric Hymns and Homerica with an English Translation by Hugh G. Evelyn-White. Homeric Hymns. Cambridge, MA.,Harvard University Press; London, William Heinemann Ltd. 1914. Online version at the Perseus Digital Library. Greek text available from the same website.
Kerényi, Carl, The Gods of the Greeks, Thames and Hudson, London, 1951.
Pausanias, Description of Greece with an English Translation by W.H.S. Jones, Litt.D., and H.A. Ormerod, M.A., in 4 Volumes. Cambridge, MA, Harvard University Press; London, William Heinemann Ltd. 1918. . Online version at the Perseus Digital Library
 Pausanias, Graeciae Descriptio. 3 vols. Leipzig, Teubner. 1903.  Greek text available at the Perseus Digital Library.

Oceanids